Itham is a Tangkhul village in Kamjong District, Manipur state, India. The village falls under Kasom sub division. The village is connected by National Highway 102A that connects Shangshak-Yairipok. Itham is flanked by Heirok in the west, Leihaoram in the south, Nongdam in the east and Moirangpurel in the north. Locally, the inhabitants speak Itham dialect that belongs to the Tibeto-Burman language family. 


Total population 
According to 2011 census, Itham comprises 48 households with the total of 240 people. The average sex ratio of the village is 1087 female to 1000 male which is higher than Manipur state average of 985.  Literacy rate of Itham is 93.85% with male literacy rate at 96.84% and female literacy rate at 91%.

People and occupation
The village is home to people of Tangkhul Naga tribe. Majority of the inhabitants are Christians. Agriculture is the primary occupation of the inhabitants. The village is known in the district for its reserve natural environment, flora and fauna. Itham is a village located downstream the Mapithel Dam and is one of the adversely affected villages post commissioning of the multi-purpose project.

References

Villages in Ukhrul district